Chen Sheu-shya (born 5 July 1959) is a Taiwanese sports shooter. She competed in the women's 10 metre air pistol event at the 1992 Summer Olympics.

References

1959 births
Living people
Taiwanese female sport shooters
Olympic shooters of Taiwan
Shooters at the 1992 Summer Olympics
Place of birth missing (living people)